Pape or PAPE may refer to:

 Pape (given name)
 Pape (surname)
 Pape (TTC), a subway station in Toronto, Canada
 Pape, Montenegro, a village in northern Montenegro
 Pape, Missouri, a community in the United States
 Le Pape, a political tract in verse by Victor Hugo
 Pape Avenue Cemetery, Toronto, Ontario
 Pape Rock, Antarctica
 Pape Village, a commercial district in Toronto, Canada
 Pope, head of the Roman Catholic Church
By extension, "Pape" is Scottish slang for a Catholic
 Provider Authentication Policy Extension, an anti-phishing extension to OpenID

See also 
Papé (disambiguation)